Michelle Gildernew (born 28 March 1970) is an Irish Sinn Féin politician from County Tyrone, Northern Ireland. She is the Member of Parliament (MP) for Fermanagh and South Tyrone, having been re-elected in June 2017 after previously holding the seat from 2001 to 2015.

Gildernew is a former Minister for Agriculture and Rural Development in the Northern Ireland Executive. She was the MP for Fermanagh and South Tyrone from 2001 to 2015, and was a Member of the Northern Ireland Assembly (MLA) for the Assembly constituency of Fermanagh and South Tyrone from June 1998 to July 2012. She was re-elected to the Assembly in 2016 and 2017. In 2017 she reclaimed her Westminster seat from Tom Elliott of the Ulster Unionist Party. In 2019, she was re-elected with the smallest majority of any constituency in the UK, a margin of just 57 votes.

Gildernew is Sinn Féin's health spokesperson, and has been a member of the party's Ard Chomhairle (National Executive). In the 2007–11 Assembly, she served as Vice Chair of the Committee of Social Development and was a member of the Committee of the centre, as well as other statutory and ad-hoc committees.

Education and background
Born in Dungannon, Gildernew attended St Catherine's College Armagh and later the University of Ulster, Coleraine. After graduating from university, she travelled extensively in Europe, the United States and Australia, where she worked for a year.

Gildernew is one of ten siblings from an Irish republican family based at the "Gildernew farm complex" (as described on Ordnance Survey maps) in County Tyrone. During the 1960s, the family were leading figures in the Northern Ireland Civil Rights Association and took part in a 1968 protest in Caledon, County Tyrone over housing discrimination.

Political career
On returning to Northern Ireland in 1996, Gildernew was the second-placed but unsuccessful candidate for Sinn Féin in the Northern Ireland Forum elections for Fermanagh and South Tyrone. The following year, she was appointed Sinn Féin representative to London and was part of the first Sinn Féin delegation to visit Downing Street. In the 1998 Assembly elections, she was elected MLA for Fermanagh and South Tyrone, retaining the seat in the 2003 and 2007 elections. Gildernew has campaigned on women's and mothers' rights.

Election to Westminster
In the 2001 UK general election, Gildernew was elected to Parliament as Member for Fermanagh and South Tyrone, defeating the Ulster Unionist candidate James Cooper by 53 votes. She was the first female candidate elected from her party to the House of Commons in over 80 years since Constance Markievicz in 1918. Like all Sinn Féin MPs, she followed a policy of abstentionism and never took her seat in Westminster in the five times she was elected at the polls.

In the 2005 election, she was re-elected and increased her majority to 4,582 votes. In the 2010 election, the Democratic Unionists (DUP), Ulster Conservatives and Unionists and Traditional Unionist Voice (TUV) all chose not to field candidates and she held her seat by four votes against Independent Unionist Rodney Connor.

In October 2014, Sinn Féin announced that Gildernew would be the party's candidate in the 2015 Westminster election. She lost the seat by 530 votes to Ulster Unionist Party candidate Tom Elliott. According to the Times Guide to the House of Commons, Gildernew was popular across the sectarian divide in one of Northern Ireland's most polarised constituencies.

She won her seat back in 2017, beating Elliott by 875 votes. Elliott closed the gap to a mere 57 votes in 2019, making Fermanagh and South Tyrone the most marginal seat in the country.

Minister for Agriculture and Rural Development
During her time as Minister for Agriculture and Rural Development, Gildernew dealt with problems such as an outbreak of bluetongue disease. She also increased cross-border co-operation with the Republic of Ireland on farming issues.

2011 Irish presidential election
In September 2011, the Belfast Telegraph reported that Sinn Féin was considering Gildernew as their candidate for that year's Irish presidential election. Sinn Féin would ultimately nominate Martin McGuinness for president.

Support for Seán Quinn
In a July 2012 interview for The Impartial Reporter, Gildernew defended embattled businessman Seán Quinn, saying that "[h]e has been treated disgracefully by the Irish Government. Had they not tried to strip him of all his assets, including his home, deny him the ability to function in business, and routinely try to humiliate him I believe he would have paid back every penny he owed to the Irish taxpayer". Quinn, the former head of the privately owned Quinn Group (now Aventas), was declared bankrupt in January 2012. (With loans worth around €1.2 billion from the Anglo-Irish Bank, the QUINN group was exposed by its collapse and, on 30 March 2010, the High Court appointed joint provisional administrators to Quinn Insurance.)

Sinn Féin distanced themselves from Gildernew's comments with Mary Lou McDonald stating that the Quinns had engaged in illegal business practices.

Personal life
Gildernew is married to Jimmy Taggart and is the mother of two boys, Emmet and Eunan, and one girl, Aoise.

References

|-

|-

|-

|-

|-

1970 births
Living people
20th-century women politicians from Northern Ireland
21st-century women politicians from Northern Ireland
Alumni of Ulster University
Female members of the Northern Ireland Assembly
Female members of the Parliament of the United Kingdom for Northern Irish constituencies
Members of the Parliament of the United Kingdom for Fermanagh and South Tyrone (since 1950)
Ministers of the Northern Ireland Executive (since 1999)
Northern Ireland MLAs 1998–2003
Northern Ireland MLAs 2003–2007
Northern Ireland MLAs 2007–2011
Northern Ireland MLAs 2011–2016
Northern Ireland MLAs 2016–2017
Northern Ireland MLAs 2017–2022
People from Dungannon
Sinn Féin MLAs
Sinn Féin MPs (post-1921)
UK MPs 2001–2005
UK MPs 2005–2010
UK MPs 2010–2015
UK MPs 2017–2019
UK MPs 2019–present
Women ministers of the Northern Ireland Executive